Pseudogonalos is a genus of insects belonging to the family Trigonalidae.

The species of this genus are found in Europe.

Species
Species include:

 Pseudogonalos angusta Schulz, 1906 
 Pseudogonalos hahnii (Spinola, 1840)

References

Hymenoptera
Hymenoptera genera